The Descente Classic was a professional golf tournament on the Japan Golf Tour. Founded in 1992 by sponsors Descente, it was renamed the Descente Classic Munsingwear Cup in 1995 and played until 1999, after which it was merged with the KSB Open to create the Munsingwear Open KSB Cup.

Tournament hosts

Winners

Notes

References

External links
Coverage on Japan Golf Tour's official site

Defunct golf tournaments in Japan
Former Japan Golf Tour events
Recurring sporting events established in 1992
Recurring sporting events disestablished in 1999
1992 establishments in Japan
1999 disestablishments in Japan